The Roman Catholic Diocese of Daltonganj is a diocese located in the city of Daltonganj in the Ecclesiastical province of Ranchi in India.

History
 5 June 1971: Established as Diocese of Daltonganj from the Metropolitan Archdiocese of Ranchi

Leadership
 Bishops of Daltonganj (Latin Rite)
 Bishop Gabriel Kujur, S.J. (3 March 1997 – 7 July 2016)
 Bishop Charles Soreng, S.J. (23 October 1989 – 1 April 1995)
 Bishop George Victor Saupin, S.J. (5 June 1971 – 30 November 1987)

References

 GCatholic.org 
 Catholic Hierarchy 

Roman Catholic dioceses in India
Christian organizations established in 1971
Roman Catholic dioceses and prelatures established in the 20th century
1971 establishments in Bihar
Christianity in Jharkhand
Medininagar